The Prix Rosny-Aîné is a literary prize for French science fiction.  It has been awarded annually since 1980 in two categories: best novel and best short fiction.

Best Novel Winners

1980 : Michel Jeury, for Le territoire humain
1981 : Michel Jeury, for Les yeux géants
1982 : Elisabeth Vonarburg, for Le silence de la cité
1983 : Emmanuel Jouanne, for Damiers imaginaires
1984 : Jean-Pierre Hubert, for Le champ du rêveur
1985 : Emmanuel Jouanne, for Ici-bas
1986 : Jean-Pierre Hubert, for Ombromanies
1987 : Francis Berthelot, for La ville au fond de l'œil
1988 : (tied) Joëlle Wintrebert, for Les olympiades truquées
1988 : (tied) Roland C. Wagner, for Le serpent d'angoisse
1989 : Roland C. Wagner, for Poupée aux yeux morts
1990 : Yves Fremion, for L'hétéradelphe de Gane
1991 : Pierre Stolze, for Cent mille images
1992 : Jean-Claude Dunyach, for Étoiles mortes (Aigue Marine/Nivôse)
1993 : Alain Le Bussy, for Deltas
1994 : Richard Canal, for Ombres blanches
1995 : Richard Canal, for Aube noire
1996 : Maurice Dantec, for Les Racines du mal
1997 : Serge Lehman, for F.A.U.S.T.
1998 : Roland C. Wagner, for L'odyssée de l'espèce
1999 : Jean-Marc Ligny, for Jihad
2000 : Michel Pagel, for L'équilibre des paradoxes
2001 : Johan Heliot, for La Lune seule le sait
2002 : Laurent Genefort, for Omale
2003 : Joëlle Wintrebert, for Pollen
2004 : Roland C. Wagner, for La Saison de la Sorcière
2005 : Xavier Mauméjean, for La Vénus anatomique
2006 : Catherine Dufour, for Le Goût de l'immortalité
2007 : Jean-Marc Ligny, for Aqua TM
2008 : Élise Fontenaille, for Unica
2009 : Xavier Mauméjean, for Lilliputia
2010 : Ugo Bellagamba, for Tancrède. Une uchronie
2011 : Laurent Whale, for Les Pilleurs d'Âmes
2012 : Roland C. Wagner, for Rêves de gloire
2013 : Laurent Genefort, for Points chauds
2014 : Ayerdhal, for Rainbow Warriors and L. L. Kloetzer, for Anamnèse de Lady Star (ex-æquo)
2015 : Ayerdhal, for Bastards
2016 : Laurent Genefort, for Lum'en
2017 : François Rouiller, for Métaquine®

Best Short Fiction Winners

1980 : Joëlle Wintrebert, for La créode
1981 : (tied) Jacques Boireau, for Chronique de la vallée
1981 : (tied) Serge Brussolo, for Subway, éléments pour une mythologie du métro
1982 : Christine Renard, for La nuit des albiens
1983 : Roland C. Wagner, for Faire-part
1984 : Lionel Évrard, for Le clavier incendié
1985 : Jean-Pierre Hubert, pour Pleine peau
1986 : Sylvie Lainé, for Le chemin de la rencontre
1987 : Gérard Klein, for Mémoire morte
1988 : Jean-Pierre Hubert, for Roulette mousse
1989 : Francis Valéry, for Bumpie(TM)
1990 : Francis Valéry, for Les voyageurs sans mémoire
1991 : Raymond Milesi, for Extra-muros
1992 : Jean-Claude Dunyach, for L'autre côté de l'eau
1993 : Wildy Petoud, for Accident d'amour
1994 : Raymond Milesi, for L'heure du monstre
1995 : Serge Lehman, for Dans l'abîme
1996 : Serge Delsemme, for Voyage organisé
1997 : Roland C. Wagner, for H.P.L. (1890-1991)
1998 : Jean-Claude Dunyach, for Déchiffrer la trame
1999 : Jean-Jacques Nguyen, for L'amour au temps du silicium
2000 : Sylvie Denis, for Dedans, dehors
2001 : Claude Ecken, for La fin du big bang
2002 : Raymond Milesi, for Le sommeil de la libellule
2003 : (tied) Jean-Jacques Girardot, for Gris et amer 1 : Les Visiteurs de l'éclipse
2003 : (tied) Sylvie Lainé, for Un signe de Setty
2004 : Claude Ecken, for Fragments lumineux du disque d'accrétion
2005 : Ugo Bellagamba, for Chimères
2006 : Sylvie Lainé, for Les Yeux d'Elsa
2007 : Serge Lehman, for Origami
2008 : Jean-Claude Dunyach, for Repli sur soie
2009 : Jeanne-A Debats, for La Vieille Anglaise et le continent
2010 : Jérôme Noirez, for Terre de fraye
2011 : Timothée Rey, for Suivre à travers le bleu cet éclair puis cette ombre
2012 : Ugo Bellagamba, for Journal d'un poliorcète repenti
2013 : Ayerdhal, for RCW and Thomas Geha, for Les Tiges (ex-æquo)
2014 : Christian Léourier, for Le Réveil des hommes blancs
2015 : Sylvie Lainé, for L'Opéra de Shaya
2016 : Laurent Genefort, for Ethfrag
2017 : Estelle Faye, for Les anges tièdes

External links
 Prix Rosny-Aîné

French science fiction awards